Beacon is the fourteenth solo album by Susumu Hirasawa.

Overview
Beacon is Hirasawa's first mainline solo album since The Man Climbing the Hologram in 2015. The six-year gap broke a pattern existent since 2000 of one mainline album every three years; this excludes Kaku P-Model releases which did not follow the pattern.

Two of the album's songs, "COLD SONG" and "The End of TIMELINE", were made public ahead of the album's release; first performed at the  shows in April 2021, and later studio renditions were published on Hirasawa's official YouTube channel on July 21.

Due to the "deteriorating international postal situation" as a result of the COVID-19 pandemic, the album was not available for international shipping through the album's label, TESLAKITE. In response, both Beacon and Kai=Kai were made available as digital downloads through Bandcamp. 

Members of Hirasawa's official fan club, Green Nerve, could additionally download karaoke versions of the album's songs and a second version of "The Man Who Falls Down" for free, even if they had not bought the album.

"COLD SONG" is the first cover to be included in a mainline Hirasawa solo album. The song is an adapted rendition with new lyrics of the song of the same name by Klaus Nomi from his 1981 album Klaus Nomi, itself an adaptation of the aria "What Power art thou, who from below..." from Henry Purcell's 1691 semi-opera King Arthur.

Track listing

Personnel
 Susumu Hirasawa - Vocals, guitar, keyboard, personal computer, digital audio workstation, synthesizer, sampler, sequencer, programming, production
 Masanori Chinzei - Recording, mixing, mastering
 Toshifumi Nakai - Design
 Syotaro Takami - Translation
 Presented by Chaos Union/TESLAKITE: Mika Hirano, Rihito Yumoto, Kinuko Mochizuki and Kenta Kogure

Chart performance

References

External links
 Beacon Bandcamp page

Susumu Hirasawa albums
2021 albums